Dukhovshchinsky District  is an administrative and municipal district (raion), one of the twenty-five in Smolensk Oblast, Russia. It is located in the north of the oblast and borders with Belsky District of Tver Oblast in the north, Kholm-Zhirkovsky District in the northeast, Yartsevsky District in the east, Kardymovsky District in the south, Smolensky District in the southwest, Demidovsky District in the west, and with Zharkovsky District of Tver Oblast in the northwest. Its administrative center is the town of Dukhovshchina. Population: 16,658 (2010 Census);  The population of Dukhovshchina accounts for 42.4% of the district's total population.

Geography
The area of the district is split between the drainage basins of the Dnieper (south and center) and the Western Dvina rivers (north). The main rivers in district are the Arzhat in the basin of the Western Dvina, the Gobza, a right tributary of the Kasplya, also in the basin of the Western Dvina, the Khmost a tributary of the Dnieper, and the Tsarevich and the Votrya, both tributaries of the Vop, another right tributary of the Dnieper.

Economy

Transportation
A paved road which connects M1 in Kamenka with M9 in Nelidovo crosses the district from south to north, passing Dukhovshchina. It also provides connection to Bely. Dukhovshchina is also connected by roads with Demidov and with Yartsevo. There are also local roads, with bus traffic originating from Dukhovshchina.

The closest railway stations are in Smolensk and in Yartsevo.

References

Notes

Sources

Districts of Smolensk Oblast